The Tyosovo peat railway is located in Novgorod Oblast, Russia.

History 
The first 30-kilometre section of the line was opened in 1939 in the area of Novgorodsky District, Novgorod Oblast, from the village Tyosovo-Netylskiy to the swamp peat fields. The peat railway was built for hauling peat and workers and operates year-round. During World War II, the railway became a place of fierce fighting and suffered damage. After the war it was restored as soon as possible, as it was the least badly damaged of all such narrow-gauge railways around Leningrad.

As the number of extracted peat grew up in 1951 was based Tyosovskoe transport management, which was engaged in handling and transportation of peat on the narrow-gauge railway. In the mid-1950s it began the construction of the workers' settlements Tyosovo-2 and Tyosovo-4, where were built standard depots. The station Tyosovo-1 (a.k.a. Tyosovo-Netylsky) was built rack for handling peat and a locomotive-car shed. On the road was inculcated traffic light signals, communication on locomotives. On the narrow-gauge railway, passenger traffic has been organized between settlements Tyosovo-Netylsky, Tyosovo-2 and Tyosovo-4.  The original locomotive fleet were steam locomotives.

By 1970 a complete reconstruction of the narrow-gauge railway had been completed – the road laid concrete sleepers on the arrows installed actuators. On the road, introducing new travel and peat machine, the local design office is developing a new rolling stock on the narrow-gauge locomotives were TU4 and TU7. Extraction of peat has reached enormous proportions, peat worked around the clock, with more than a dozen fields exported formulations with peat by 30 or more cars each from the station. On the whole system was a total of more than 30 locomotives and railcars.

Current status 

After perestroika Tyosovskoe TM, as well as many businesses in the country, has been liquidated and all the property transferred to several new peats. The turning point for the life of the narrow-gauge railway began in 1994 – the main consumers abandoned peat, its production fell to almost zero, it exported only for the needs of the township boilers. Rolling stock started to sell for scrap, nearly 200-kilometer narrow-gauge system is also put into scrap metal. He was pulled on the way Tyosovo-4, and in 1995 stopped traffic on Tyosovo-2. In 2002, the way there was completely sold for scrap. After a few years separate the work Peats Tyosovo-2 and Tyosovo-4 were eliminated.

Now only peat enterprise Tyosovo-1 exist. Currently, interest in peat began to emerge again as a fuel and for agriculture – and this is a chance to preserve and develop Tyosovo NGR.

In 2015 a narrow-gauge length of the main course of the road is about 16 km, access, station tracks and dead ends – about 9 km. Extraction of peat produced regularly.

Rolling stock

Locomotives 

 TU6P – No. 0050
 TU6A – No. 3723
 ESU2A – No. 179, 709

Railway cars 

 Flatcar
 Tank car
 Snowplow
 Track laying cranes
 Passenger car PV40
 Open wagon for peat TSV6A
 Hopper car to transport track ballast

Tyosovo Railway Museum 

The Tyosovo Railway Museum is the outdoor railway museum in Novgorod Oblast, located in Tyosovo-Netylskiy, opened in 2014. The museum is located close to the Tyosovo-1 station, the major attraction of the village Tyosovo-Netylskiy. It displays various historical rolling stock and is used for military-historical festivals.

Museum's collection

Locomotives and draisines
 TU4 – No. 1030
 TU4 – No. 2630
 Draisine – PD-1-353
 Draisine – TD-5u
 Draisine – armored TD-5u for military-historical festivals

Railway car 
 Passenger car – PV40
 Tank cars – VC20
 Hopper car 42-074

See also 
 Narrow-gauge railways in Russia
 List of Russian narrow-gauge railways rolling stock

References

External links 

 Official Tyosovo Railway Museum Facebook
 Official Tyosovo Railway Museum VKontakte  
 Official Tyosovo Railway Museum Instagram 
 Photo – project "Steam Engine" 
 Track repair on Tyosovo narrow-gauge railroad YouTube

Railway museums in Russia
750 mm gauge railways in Russia
Rail transport in Novgorod Oblast
Museums in Novgorod Oblast